Ramona Airport  is a public airport two miles west of Ramona, in San Diego County, California, United States.

The airport is mostly used for general aviation, the California Department of Forestry (CDF) and the United States Forest Service (USFS) jointly operate a fire attack base.

The Ramona Air Fair is a popular airshow held every year in October.

Most U.S. airports use the same three-letter location identifier for the FAA and IATA, but Ramona Airport is RNM to the FAA and has no IATA code.

Facilities

In 2005 the airport had 82,133 aircraft operations, averaging 225 per day: 98% general aviation, 1% air taxi and 1% military. 195 aircraft are based at this airport: 86% single engine, 8% multi-engine, 1% jet and 5% helicopters.

In 2007 the airport had 164,691 aircraft operations, averaging 451 per day.

Classic Rotors Museum 
Classic Rotors Museum, a flying aviation museum specializing in helicopters and other rotorcraft, is based at Ramona Airport. The museum bills itself as "the rare and vintage rotorcraft museum" and claims to be one of "three dedicated rotorcraft museums in the world".

Ramona Bombing Target and Emergency Landing Field
During World War II the airport was used by the US Navy as the 'Ramona Bombing Target and Emergency Landing Field. The site was 405 acres and opened on October 15, 1943. The site closed after the war and was turned over to San Diego County on  February 26, 1947.

References

External links 
Ramona Airport at San Diego County website

Airports in San Diego County, California
Ramona, San Diego County, California